Allison Schulnik (born 1978) is an American painter, sculptor and animated film maker.  She is known for her heavily textured, impasto oil paintings and her animated short videos. Schulnik is married to fellow artist Eric Yahnker. They live and work in Sky Valley, California.

Early life and education
Schulnik was born in San Diego in 1978. In 2000, she earned a Bachelor of Fine Arts in Experimental Animation from California Institute of the Arts.

Art practice
A multidisciplinary artist, Schulnik is known both for her paintings and her animated video and film works.

As a painter, her signature style is to use thick layers of oil paint to create heavily textured works that are almost sculptural in terms of their depth.  These paintings often begin by creating preliminary drawings, followed by the creation of the painting, where she relies on spontaneity and gesture to create texture with her hands. Thematically, her paintings often depict phantom-like creatures and boneless animals that appear to be melting off of the canvas.

Schulnik's animated works begin with the creation of small sculptures of figures and objects  made from clay, paint and other materials. She has also used traditional hand-drawn animation techniques in some works.

Her freestanding sculptural works, usually made of ceramic, are often exhibited alongside her paintings and animated works.

Schulnik's collaborations with musicians include the 2009 stop-motion/claymation video Forest for the song  Ready, Able by Grizzly Bear. In 2015, Deafheaven selected a painting by Schulnik to use for the cover art of their album New Bermuda.

Solo exhibitions
 2020 Hatch, PPOW, New York
 2017 Nest, Galeria Jaier Lopez & Fer Frances, Madrid, Spain
 2017 Eager, Flint Institute of the Arts, Flint, Michigan
 2016 Hoof II, ZieherSmith, New York
 2016 Hoof, Mark Moore Gallery, Culver City, California
 2014 Allison Schulnik/Martix 168, Wadsworth Atheneum Museum of Art, Hartford, Connecticut
 2014 Eager, ZieherSmith, New York
 2013 EX.POSE: Allison Schulnik, Laguna Art Museum, Laguna, California
 2012 Salty Air, Mark Moore Gallery, Los Angeles, CA 
 2012 Mound, Oklahoma City Art Museum, OK 
 2012 Mound, Nerman Museum of Contemporary Art, MO 
 2011 Mound, ZieherSmith, New York, NY 
 2011 Performance, Division Gallery, Montreal, QC, Canada 
 2010 Home for Hobo Too, Tony Wight Gallery, Chicago 
 2010 Home for Hobo, Mark Moore Gallery, Santa Monica, CA 
 2009 Allison Schulnik, Unosunove, Rome, IT 
 2009 - Go West, Mark Moore Gallery, New York, NY 
 2008 No Luck Too, Mike Weiss Gallery, New York, NY 
 2007 No Luck, Rokeby Gallery, London, UK 
 2007 Fools, Rejects, and Sanctuaries, Mark Moore Gallery, Santa Monica, CA

Filmography and videography
 2019: Moth - Hand-painted gouache on paper, animated video, 3:15
 2014: Eager - Stop-motion/claymation video, 8:30
 2011: Mound - Stop-motion/claymation video, 4:33
 2009: Forest - stop-motion/claymation video, 4:30, for the song  Ready, Able by Grizzly Bear, from the album Veckatimest.
 2008: Hobo Clown - stop-motion/claymation video, 5:00
 2000: Pistachio - 16mm Stop-motion animated film, 7:00
 1999: Vedma - 16mm Stop-motion animated film, 5:00
 1997: The Slaying - 16mm Stop-motion/live action animated film, 1:00

Awards
2014 Ottawa International Animation Festival - Best Abstract/Experimental Animation Film for Eager
2014 South by Southwest Film Festival - Special Jury Recognition Award for Eager
2010 South by Southwest Film Festival - Feature Film Audience Award Runner-Up for Forest

Collections
Albright-Knox Art Gallery
Chapman University
Crocker Art Museum
Farnsworth Art Museum
Laguna Art Museum
Los Angeles County Museum of Art
Montreal Museum of Contemporary Art
Museum of Fine Arts Houston
Museé des Beaux Arts de Montréal
Museum of Contemporary Art San Diego
Nerman Museum of Contemporary Art
Santa Barbara Museum of Art
US Department of State
Wadsworth Atheneum

References

1978 births
Living people
California Institute of the Arts alumni
American women painters
American women sculptors
21st-century American women artists
American animators
American women animators